Donald Day Carrick, (September 18, 1906 – February 28, 1997) was an Ontario lawyer, political figure, Olympic boxer, and Canadian national golf champion. He represented Toronto Trinity as a Liberal member from 1954 to 1957.

Biography 
Carrick was born in Port Arthur, Ontario, the son of John James Carrick. He studied at the University of Toronto, Osgoode Hall Law School, and Harvard Law School. Carrick was an exceptional athlete. He represented Canada as a light-heavyweight boxer at the 1928 Summer Olympics in Amsterdam, where he won his first-round bout against Jean Welter of Luxembourg, but then lost on points to the eventual Olympic champion, Víctor Avendaño of Argentina. In golf, he was coached as a youth by Newell Senour at the Scarboro Club, won the 1923 Ontario Junior Championship, the Canadian Amateur Championship in 1925 and 1927, and the Ontario Amateur Championship in 1926 and 1933. Carrick served as a Lieutenant-Colonel in the Canadian Army during World War II. He was elected to the House of Commons of Canada in a 1954 by-election, held after the death of Lionel Conacher.

Carrick played golf recreationally after 1933, at the Scarboro and Rosedale Golf Clubs in Toronto. He was elected to the Canadian Golf Hall of Fame in 1997.

Electoral record

References

External links

Profile at Canadian Golf Hall of Fame
U of T Sports Hall of Fame List

Amateur golfers
Boxers at the 1928 Summer Olympics
Boxers from Toronto
Canadian Army officers
Canadian male boxers
Canadian male golfers
Canadian military personnel of World War II
Canadian Officers of the Order of the British Empire
Canadian sportsperson-politicians
Golfing people from Ontario
Harvard Law School alumni
Lawyers in Ontario
Liberal Party of Canada MPs
Light-heavyweight boxers
Members of the House of Commons of Canada from Ontario
Olympic boxers of Canada
Osgoode Hall Law School alumni
Politicians from Thunder Bay
Politicians from Toronto
Sportspeople from Thunder Bay
University of Toronto alumni
20th-century Canadian lawyers
1906 births
1997 deaths